The Great Māhele  ("to divide or portion") or just the Māhele was the Hawaiian land redistribution proposed by King Kamehameha III. The Māhele was one of the most important episodes of Hawaiian history, second only to the overthrow of the Hawaiian Kingdom. While intended to provide secure title to indigenous Hawaiians, it separated many of them from their land.

Bill of Rights 

The 1839 Hawaiian Bill of Rights, also known as the 1840 Constitution of the Kingdom of Hawaii, was an attempt by Kamehameha III and his chiefs to guarantee that the Hawaiian people would not lose their tenured land, and provided the groundwork for a free enterprise system. The document, which had an attached code of laws, was drafted by Lahainaluna missionary school alumnus Boaz Mahune, revised by the Council of Chiefs and by Kamehameha III in June 1839.

1840 Constitution of the Kingdom of Hawaii 
The 1840 Constitution of the Kingdom of Hawaii established a constitutional monarchy. It stated that the land belonged to its people and was to be managed by the king. It established executive, legislative and judicial branches of government. The document established allodial title property rights which maintained the lands in the hands of Hawaiian subjects to mālama (nurture and sustain).

In order to protect Hawaiian lands from foreigners, Kamehameha III divided the lands among all the people of Hawaiʻi, aliʻi, konohiki and makaʻainana alike. The Mahele changed the previous land system under which the kuleana (responsibility and obligation) to mālama ʻāina was given by the mōʻī (king) to an aliʻi nui (high chief), his subordinate aliʻi and konohiki who received taxes and tribute from the people who worked the land collectively. Private land ownership did not exist.

The Māhele came into effect on March 7, 1848. It allocated one-third of the land to the mōʻī (monarch), known as Hawaiian crown lands. Another third was allocated among the aliʻi and konohiki (chiefs and managers of each ahupuaʻa (traditional land division running from the coast to the mountaintop). The remaining one-third was given to the makaʻāinana (common people). The law required land claims to be filed within two years under the Kuleana Act of 1850. Many Hawaiians made no claim.

Most of the land was sold by the government of the Republic to settlers from the continental US or auctioned to the Big Five corporations. This resulted in the state owning 32% of the land, while another 4.8% became Hawaiian Homelands.

Legislative action

Alien Land Ownership Act 

While opponents Kamehameha IV, Kamehameha V and missionary physician Gerrit Judd were traveling, on July 10, 1850 the legislature passed the Alien Land Ownership Act. It allowed foreigners to hold title to land. The Act was written by Chief Justice William Little Lee. The justification was the promise of prosperity resulting from an influx of capital and labor.

Kuleana Act-August 6, 1850 

The Kuleana Act of 1850 allowed commoners to petition for title to land that they cultivated and lived on, similar to the homesteading laws used to manage land tenure in US territories in the nineteenth century. It abolished the right of cultivation and pasturage on the larger, common lands, title of which went to the chief, the crown or the government.

Ownership of land was a previously unknown concept for ordinary Hawaiians. Many did not understand the need to make a claim for land where they already lived and/or worked. Communication depended upon word-of-mouth or literacy. Making a claim required money to pay for a pre-claim land survey. The system required two witnesses to confirm that the claimant had worked the land.

About 18,000 plots of 3 acres each were successfully claimed,. representing 28,658 acres, or less than 1% of Hawaii’s land area (this was partly because significant parts of the mountainous islands were not suitable for agriculture or settlement). The Kingdom's population at the time was some 82,000. Members of higher classes and aliʻi obtained most Hawaiian land. Many successful claimants later lost their property due to the ongoing effect of western diseases and property taxes.

See also 

 1852 Constitution of the Kingdom of Hawaii
 1864 Constitution of the Kingdom of Hawaii
 1887 Constitution of the Kingdom of Hawaii
 1893 Constitution of the Kingdom of Hawaii
 Hawaiian home land
 Kuleana rights
 Native Hawaiians

References

Further reading

External links 
 Mahele Book, Hawaii State Archives
 "Ua Koe Ke Kuleana O Na Kanaka"
 

Hawaiian Kingdom
Indigenous land rights in Hawaii
1848 in Hawaii
1848 in law
Legal history of Hawaii